The Canglang Pavilion (Suzhou Wu: Tshaon laon din), variously translated as the Great Wave Pavilion, Surging Wave Pavilion, or Blue Wave Pavilion, is one of the Classical Gardens of Suzhou that are jointly recognized as a UNESCO World Heritage Site. It is located at 3 Canglangting Street in Suzhou, Jiangsu China.

History 
The Canglang Pavilion was built in 1044 CE by the Song dynasty poet Su Shunqin (1008–1048), on the site of a pre-existing imperial flower garden c 960 CE. It is the oldest of the UNESCO gardens in Suzhou, keeping its original Song dynasty layout. The name is derived from a verse in the poem Fishermen by Qu Yuan (ca. 340 BCE-278 BCE), a poet from the southern state of Chu during the Warring States period, in his book Songs of the South, "If the Canglang River is dirty I wash my muddy feet; If the Canglang River is clean I wash my ribbon". This verse alludes to an honest official who removes himself from politics rather than act in a corrupt manner. Su Shunqing choose this to express his feelings after his removal from office.

After his death the garden passed through many owners and fell into disuse until 1696 CE when it was restored by Song Luo, the governor of Jiangsu Province. In 1827 ownership was transferred to governor Tao Zhu and again in 1873 ownership was transferred to governor Zhang Shusheng.  In 1955 the garden was opened to the public and in 2000 it was added to the UNESCO World Cultural Heritage Monuments.

Design 
The 1.6 ha garden is divided into two main sections. The garden is sited on a branch of the Fengxi Stream which forms a lotus pond. The garden has 108 windows each one with a unique design.

See also 
Chinese garden

References

Citations

Sources

External links

Classical Gardens of Suzhou, UNESCO's official website on World Heritage Site.
Surging Waves Pavilion (Canglangting) at Asian Historical Architecture.

Classical Gardens of Suzhou
Major National Historical and Cultural Sites in Jiangsu